

Players

Competitions

Division Two

League table

Results summary

League position by match

Matches

FA Cup

Worthington Cup

Auto Windscreens Shield

Appearances, goals and cards

References

1998-99
Northampton Town
Northampton Town